The state funeral of King Hussein of Jordan took place in Amman on 8 February 1999. He was pronounced dead on 7 February 1999 at 11:43 AM at the King Hussein Medical Center. The funeral was the largest gathering of royalty and world leaders since 1995.

Illness

It was made public that King Hussein was diagnosed with lymphatic cancer at the Mayo Clinic Hospital in Rochester, Minnesota in July 1998. Hussein's lymphoma was of a type that responded to chemotherapy, which the King had already begun and his physicians were optimistic he could be cured.

On his way back to Jordan in January 1999 after six months of treatment in the US, Hussein stopped in London. Doctors advised him to rest and stay in England for a few weeks, as he was still too fragile to travel. According to Jordanian government sources, Hussein stated that:

“I need very much to feel the warmth of my people around me, there is work to be done and I will get the strength from my people to finish the business.“

On 25 January 1999, only six days after returning to Jordan, Hussein relapsed and was rushed back to the Mayo Clinic for a second bone marrow transplant.

Death
Doctors at his US clinic said that the king suffered internal organ failure following an unsuccessful bone marrow transplant, "The king is in agony. He is being kept alive by artificial means. There is no more hope," an official told the Agence France-Presse news agency.

On 4 February 1999, Hussein was taken by helicopter to an intensive care unit at the King Hussein Medical Center, west of Amman. He was later reported to be in a coma and on a life support machine after his organs failed. Outside the King Hussein Medical Center, wails of grief rose up in a crowd of Jordanians who had maintained a vigil there since the king's return. The palace sources said King Hussein's family had decided not to switch off his life support machine, preferring to let him die naturally. Jordanian television said in a news bulletin on Friday (5 February 1999) night that King Hussein was still under intensive care. Television presenters wore black and programmes about the king's life were broadcast.

King Hussein's heart stopped on 7 February 1999 at 11:43 am. Queen Noor and four of his five sons were at his side. His eldest son, Abdullah, who was named Crown Prince on 24 January 1999, was called to the hospital and, after his arrival, the king was removed from the respirator and pronounced dead. At that time, King Hussein was the longest-serving executive head of state in the world.

The death of King Hussein was announced on local TV by a presenter in Arabic, "Believing in God's will and with deep sorrow, the cabinet tells the Jordanian people and all our brothers in the Muslim world, and all our friends around the world, of the death of the dearest among men, His Hashemite Majesty, King Hussein Bin Talal the Great, king of the Hashemite Kingdom of Jordan, dean of the House of the Prophet, whom God has chosen to be next to him and who passed to heaven at 11:43. The cabinet asks that God will be compassionate with His Majesty and that He will give him a place among those He loves. Verily we belong to God, and to God we return."

Succession
A few hours after Hussein's death was announced, Abdullah went before a hastily called session of the National Assembly and took the oath of office. Zaid al-Rifai, speaker of the House of Notables (Senate), opened the session with Al-Fatiha, a prayer for the dead.

Funeral

The flag-draped coffin carrying the body of King Hussein accompanied by honor guard troops wearing Keffiyeh were taken on a 90-minute procession through the streets of the capital city of Amman. An estimated 800,000 Jordanians, many of them weeping, braved chilly winds to bid their leader farewell. Riot police were stationed along the nine-mile-long route to try to hold back the crowds who scrambled for a glimpse of the coffin.

Upon arrival at Raghadan Palace, the new king, Hussein's eldest son, Abdullah, and the royal princes formally received the coffin. Queen Noor stood in a doorway surrounded by other royal women and watched from the gates of the cemetery as the king was buried.

Dignitaries
Hundreds of dignitaries attended the funeral in the largest gathering of world leaders since the 1995 funeral of Israeli Prime Minister Yitzhak Rabin. At least 60 heads of state and government and 15 former leaders attended, as well as about 100 governmental representatives and some multilateral leaders. In all, six organizations and more than 120 countries were represented.  Also presented was the president of the Arab League, Samir Hosny. Hamas was present with a delegation of several representatives, led by its leader, Khalid Meshaal. United Nations Secretary-General Kofi Annan, his wife Nane Maria Annan and UNESCO Director General Koichiro Matsuura attended the funeral along with many of their colleagues such as European Union's Jacques Santer, NATO's Javier Solana, IMF's Michel Camdessus and African Union's Salim Ahmed Salim. Israeli Prime Minister Benjamin Netanyahu led the country's delegation, including Chief Rabbi Yesrael Lau and a representative of the families of seven teenage girls killed by a Jordanian soldier in 1997. 

The funeral also brought together enemies, including the leader of the Democratic Front for the Liberation of Palestine, Nayef Hawatmeh, who approached the Israeli president Ezer Weizman, praised him as a man of peace and shook his hand. It was the first time that Syrian president Hafez al-Assad and Benjamin Netanyahu were together in the same place, though they did not meet.

Other dignitaries included: 
: president Liamine Zeroual 
:  Foreign Minister Vartan Oskanian
: vice-president Taha Marouf
: president Mohammad Khatami
: King Albert II and prime minister Guy Verhofstadt
: Emir Isa bin Salman Al Khalifa of Bahrain and Prime Minister Khalifa ibn Salman Al Khalifa 
: Ahmed Abdel Megid
: Prince Charles, the Prince of Wales, William Hague, British prime minister Tony Blair and his predecessors Margaret Thatcher and John Major, Paddy Ashdown
: vice president Krishan Kant
: Shimon Peres, Yitzhak Shamir, Leah Rabin, Ariel Sharon, Ehud Barak, Yitzhak Mordechai, Efraim Halevy, Salah Tarif, Sheikh Mowafak Tarif, Yisrael Meir Lau, Taleb el-Sana, Abdulmalik Dehamshe, Ahmad Tibi
: president Thomas Klestil
: prime minister Davíð Oddsson
: deputy premier Veselin Metodiev
: President Václav Havel
: Arnold Rüütel
: president Hosni Mubarak and prime minister Kamal Ganzouri
: president Haris Silajdžić
: president Glafcos Klerides and Minister of Foreign Affairs Ioannis Kasoulidis
: Prince Henrik, Princess Irene of Greece and Denmark and prime minister Poul Nyrup Rasmussen
Aga Khan IV
: president Jacques Chirac, Bernard Kouchner
: chancellor Gerhard Schröder
: president Konstantinos Stephanopoulos, former King Constantine II, Queen Anne-Marie, Crown Princess Marie-Chantal
: president Mary McAleese, Michael Woods
: Crown Prince Jasim bin Hamad bin Khalifa Al Thani
: president Oscar Luigi Scalfaro
: Crown Prince Naruhito, prime minister Keizō Obuchi
: premier Zhu Rongji
: Crown Prince and Prime Minister Saad Al-Abdullah Al-Salim Al-Sabah 
: Grand Duke Jean and Princess Joséphine-Charlotte of Belgium and Minister for Foreign Affairs Jacques Poos
: prime minister Otmar Hasler
: Al-Saadi Gaddafi
: Interior minister Michel Murr
: president Guido de Marco 
: Qaboos bin Said al Said, Yusuf bin Alawi, Badr Al Busaidi
: Farouk al-Sharaa, Abdul Halim Khaddam 
: Yasser Arafat, Mahmoud Abbas, Ahmed Qurei, Yasser Abed Rabbo, Khaled Mashal
: president Omar al-Bashir, Mustafa Osman, Ghazi Al Atabani, Lam Akol, Swar Al Dahab
: president Martti Ahtisaari
: president Jorge Sampaio
: president Paul Kagame 
: President Boris Yeltsin, Igor Ivanov
: prime minister Nawaz Sharif, Sartaj Aziz
: King Juan Carlos I, Felipe, Prince of Asturias, Infanta Elena, Infanta Cristina, premier Jose Maria Aznar
World Bank president James Wolfensohn
: Crown Prince Mohammed 
: King Carl XVI Gustaf, Crown Princess Victoria and State minister Carl Bildt
: president Süleyman Demirel, İsmail Cem
: Prime Minister Hamed Karoui 
: Crown Prince Sheikh Mohammed bin Rashid Al Maktoum of Dubai, Mohammad bin Zayed, Abdullah bin Zayed, Mohammed Bin Kharbash
: President Bill Clinton; Former Presidents Gerald Ford, Jimmy Carter, and George H. W. Bush; Ben Gilman, David Bonior, Ted Stevens, Patrick Leahy, Sandy Berger, Dennis Ross, Thomas Pickering, Martin Indyk, Najeeb Halaby
: Queen Beatrix, prime minister Wim Kok and Minister of Foreign Affairs Hans van den Broek
: Crown Prince Alexander of Yugoslavia
: prime minister Bronisław Geremek 
: president Leonid Kuchma
: president Emil Constantinescu and Minister of Foreign Affairs Andrei Pleșu
: president Adolf Ogi
: president Momir Bulatović
: prime minister Kim Jong-pil
: Kim Yong-nam
: Sultan Hassanal Bolkiah, Queen Anak Saleha, Crown Prince Al-Muhtadee Billah
: Prince Abdullah, Prince Saud Al-Faisal, Abdul-Aziz bin Abdullah, Ibrahim Al-Assaf
: president Negasso Gidada and Ermias Sahle Selassie
: King Harald V
: Minister of Foreign Affairs Jason Hu 
: prime minister Goh Chok Tong
: president Abdulsalami Abubakar
: Prime Minister Cheikh El Avia Ould Mohamed Khouna
: president Nelson Mandela and Minister of Home Affairs Mangosuthu Buthelezi
: president Ali Abdullah Saleh.
A controversial absence from the funeral was that of Canadian prime minister Jean Chretien. Chretien, who was on a ski vacation, claimed that the short notice of the funeral made it impossible for him to attend. This decision was criticized, since the news of Hussein's health was well known.

Upon her arrival, Queen Sofia of Spain discovered that as a woman, she could not attend the funeral itself. Madeleine Albright, the US Secretary of State, also could not attend. They were treated as pilgrim travelers, waiting outside of the venue. An exception was made for female heads of state, including Queen Beatrix of the Netherlands and President Mary McAleese of Ireland.

Reactions and tributes
In memory of Hussein's death, the governments of Jordan, India, Egypt, Algeria, Kuwait, United Arab Emirates, Oman, Palestine, Yemen, and Syria declared periods of official mourning and flew their flags at half mast. 

Many world leaders expressed their condolences. United States President Bill Clinton said, "He won the respect and admiration of the entire world and so did his beloved Jordan. He is a man who believed that we are all God's children, bound to live together in mutual respect and tolerance." UK Prime Minister Tony Blair called Hussein "an extraordinary and immensely charismatic persuader for peace." Israeli Prime Minister Benjamin Netanyahu said, "With great sadness we bid farewell to you, king and friend. The peace between our peoples will be a testament to your abiding belief in a lasting peace between the sons of Abraham. Rest in peace, your majesty." The Cypriot President Glafcos Clerides described him as "a leader of international prestige, who contributed greatly to all efforts towards finding a solution to the Middle East problem. He was an exceptional figure, who spoke his mind and dealt with matters in such a way that Jordan, despite its many enemies, managed to survive as an independent state. He also contributed greatly to preventing war in the region." Russian President Boris Yeltsin said Hussein was "invaluable to the formation of a new image of the Middle East, free of stereotypes of confrontation and enmity. Greek President Konstantinos Stephanopoulos and Prime Minister Costas Simitis commended Hussein for having brought his country internal political stability and increased international respect. German Chancellor Gerhard Schroeder expressed similar sentiments.

The UN General Assembly held an Emergency Special Session in "Tribute to the Memory of His Majesty the King of Jordan" on the day of the funeral, where further tributes were made by UN President Didier Oppertti and the various heads of the United Nations Regional Groups. Individual representatives from the USA, Israel, Egypt, Russia, Palestine, and Jordan also spoke on behalf of their own nations.

References

External links
 King Hussein's official website
 World: Middle East Final farewell to King Hussein, BBC
 Video by BBC of the funeral, C-SPAN

Hussein of Jordan
1999 in Jordan
Hussein King
Hussein King
Hussein King
Hussein King
February 1999 events in Asia